The 75 mm Schneider-Danglis 06/09 was a Greek-designed and French-manufactured mountain gun.  The invention of a mountain gun that could easily be broken down to pieces for transport, and reassembled into a  highly efficient weapon is claimed by two Greek army engineers, (then) Engineering Corps Major P. Lykoudis, who made such a design in 1891, and then Artillery Major Panagiotis Danglis (Παναγιώτης Δαγκλής), who made his own design in 1893. Danglis' proposal to the Greek Army Ministry caused an immediate reaction by Lykoudis, who claimed that his designs had been copied. Surprisingly, at the time no particular interest was shown, neither by the Greek military, nor by foreign weapon manufacturers; the rivalry between the two men would continue, though, for several years.

Danglis devoted personal effort into developing the design, and eventually convinced French Schneider-Creusot armaments company to construct and test his design. Prototype development, construction and testing were completed between November 1905 and June 1906. Meanwhile, Lykoudis had arranged with the German manufacturer Krupp to develop his design. The final "victory" for Danglis came in 1907. In that year, after testing, the Greek Army determined that the Schneider-Danglis weapon was superior to the Krupp-Lykoudis and placed an order for the gun with the French manufacturer. Other nations followed with orders, and this mountain gun proved its merits in action (it was used by Greece in the Balkan Wars, World War I and World War II), while Schneider developed the technology further in the 76 mm mountain gun M1909. Danglis' efforts came to a successful conclusion altogether, when a fair financial settlement was made with the French manufacturer concerning the rights to use his design.

Gallery

Users

Notes

References

 
L.S. Skartsis, "Greek Vehicle & Machine Manufacturers 1800 to present: A Pictorial History", Marathon (2012)  (eBook)

World War I artillery of Greece
World War II artillery of Greece
Greek inventions
Mountain artillery
75 mm artillery
Artillery of the Russian Empire